The Fort Wayne Flash was a full-contact women's outdoor football team of the Women's Football Alliance based in Fort Wayne, Indiana. The team started its exhibition season in 2006 and officially became part of the National Women's Football Association and began playing league games in 2007. Home games for the 2008 season were played at Bishop John M. D’Arcy Stadium on the University of Saint Francis campus, however, starting in 2009, the team played on the campus of Woodlan Senior/Junior High School in nearby Woodburn.

In 2008, the Flash clinched their first ever playoff berth and won the Midwest Division title.  However, their playoff run was one-and-done, as they lost to the Columbus Comets 14–7.

Beginning in 2009, the Flash played in the Women's Football Alliance.

For 2010, the Flash were taking the season off to reorganize and cope with the death of player Karen O'Boyle and since then have never been heard of again.

Season-By-Season 

|-
| colspan="6" align="center" | Fort Wayne Flash (NWFA)
|-
|2007 || 4 || 4 || 0 || 2nd North West || –
|-
|2008 || 5 || 3 || 0 || 1st North Midwest || Lost First Round (Columbus)
|-
| colspan="6" align="center" | Fort Wayne Flash (WFA)
|-
|2009 || 4 || 4 || 0 || 3rd National Central || –
|-
!Totals || 13 || 12 || 0
|colspan="2"| (including playoffs)

2009 Season Schedule

See also
History of sports in Fort Wayne, Indiana

References

Smith, B. "Women show grit on football field", Fort Wayne Journal Gazette, June 15, 2008. Retrieved on 2009-04-28

External links
 Fort Wayne Flash Women's Tackle Football Official Website

American football teams in Indiana
Women's Football Alliance teams
Defunct American football teams in Indiana
Sports in Fort Wayne, Indiana
American football teams established in 2006
American football teams disestablished in 2011